Reid D. Wilson (born May 30, 1996) is an American professional stock car racing driver. He last competed part-time in the NASCAR Gander Outdoors Truck Series, driving the No. 44 Chevrolet Silverado for Niece Motorsports.

Racing career
From 2013 to 2014, Wilson ran a total of 20 races in the X-1R Pro Cup Series, driving the No. 66 Chevrolet Impala SS for his own team.

Wilson ran a total of four NASCAR K&N Pro Series East races in the 2016 and 2017 seasons for Young's Motorsports. He finished 27th in the 2016 standings, and 19th in the 2017 standings.

Wilson made his debut in the Truck Series in 2018 at Martinsville in the No. 20 Chevrolet Silverado for Young’s Motorsports. He finished 16th after starting 20th. Wilson returned to the team for the race at Iowa in one of their other trucks, the No. 12, and finished 28th.

In 2019, Wilson was announced to split the No. 45 Silverado for Niece Motorsports with Ross Chastain. However, when Chastain started performing well and winning races in his part-time schedule of races in the No. 45, he ended up running full-time in that truck and Wilson was moved to Niece's other truck, the No. 44, where he ran two races before he and sponsor TrüNorth eventually left the team. Wilson did not compete in any races with another team for the remainder of the season as well as all of 2020.

Motorsports career results

NASCAR
(key) (Bold – Pole position awarded by qualifying time. Italics – Pole position earned by points standings or practice time. * – Most laps led.)

Gander Outdoors Truck Series

K&N Pro Series East

 Season still in progress
 Ineligible for series points

References

External links
 

Living people
1996 births
NASCAR drivers
Racing drivers from Charlotte, North Carolina
CARS Tour drivers